Colleen Grondein is a former South African international lawn bowler.

Bowls career
Grondein won a gold medal in the Women's fours at the 1994 Commonwealth Games in Victoria with Anna Pretorius, Lorna Trigwell and Hester Bekker. It was the first time that South Africa had won a gold medal since 1958, following the return from their Anti-Apartheid Movement Commonwealth ban enforced in 1961.

In 1995 she won the triples gold medal and fours silver medal at the Atlantic Bowls Championships in her home country.

She bowls for the Lahee Park Bowling Club.

References

Living people
South African female bowls players
Bowls players at the 1994 Commonwealth Games
Commonwealth Games gold medallists for South Africa
Commonwealth Games medallists in lawn bowls
Year of birth missing (living people)
Medallists at the 1994 Commonwealth Games